The Palestinian keffiyeh  is a chequered black and white scarf that is usually worn around the neck or head. This keffiyeh has become a symbol of Palestinian nationalism, dating back to the 1936–1939 Arab revolt in Palestine. Outside of the Middle East and North Africa, the keffiyeh first gained popularity among activists supporting the Palestinians in the conflict with Israel and is an icon of Palestinian solidarity.

History

Traditionally worn by Palestinian farmers, during the Ottoman period the keffiyeh signalled that the wearer was rural, in contrast to the tarboosh worn by the urban classes.

The black and white keffiyeh worn by Palestinian men of any rank, became a symbol of Palestinian nationalism during the Arab Revolt of the 1930s. This reached a peak in 1938, when the leadership of the revolt ordered that the urban classes replace their traditional tarbush hats with the keffiyeh. The move was intended to create unity, as well as allow the rebels to blend in when they entered the cities.

Its prominence increased during the 1960s with the beginning of the Palestinian resistance movement and its adoption by Palestinian politician Yasser Arafat.

The black-and-white fishnet pattern keffiyeh would later become Arafat's symbol and he would rarely be seen without it; only occasionally would he wear a military cap, or, in colder climates, a Russian-style ushanka hat. Arafat would wear his keffiyeh in a semi-traditional way, wrapped around his head via an agal. He also wore a similarly patterned piece of cloth in the neckline of his military fatigues. Early on, he had made it his personal trademark to drape the scarf over his right shoulder only, arranging it in the rough shape of a triangle, to resemble the outlines of the territory claimed by Palestine. This way of wearing the keffiyeh became a symbol of Arafat as a person and political leader, and it has not been imitated by other Palestinian leaders.

Another Palestinian figure associated with the keffiyeh is Leila Khaled, a female member of the armed wing of the Popular Front for the Liberation of Palestine. Several photographs of Khaled circulated in the Western newspapers after the hijacking of TWA Flight 840 and the Dawson's Field hijackings. These photos often included Khaled wearing a keffiyeh in the style of a Muslim woman's hijab, wrapped around the head and shoulders. This was unusual, as the keffiyeh is associated with Arab masculinity, and many believe this to be something of a fashion statement by Khaled, denoting her equality with men in the Palestinian armed struggle.

The colors of the stitching in a keffiyeh are also vaguely associated with Palestinians’ political sympathies. Traditional black and white keffiyehs became associated with Fatah. Later, red and white keffiyehs were adopted by Palestinian Marxists, such as the PFLP.

Palestinian solidarity
The wearing of the keffiyeh often comes with criticism from various political factions in the ongoing Israeli–Palestinian conflict. The slang "keffiyeh kinderlach" refers to young left-wing American Jews, particularly college students, who sport a keffiyeh around the neck as a political/fashion statement. This term may have first appeared in print in an article by Bradley Burston in which he writes of “the suburban-exile kaffiyeh kinderlach of Berkeley, more Palestinian by far than the Palestinians” in their criticism of Israel. European activists have also worn the keffiyeh.

While Western protesters wear differing styles and shades of keffiyeh, the most prominent is the black-and-white keffiyeh. This is typically worn around the neck like a neckerchief, simply knotted in the front with the fabric allowed to drape over the back. Other popular styles include rectangular-shaped scarves with the basic black-and-white pattern in the body, with the ends knitted in the form of the Palestinian flag. Since the Al-Aqsa Intifada, these rectangular scarves have increasingly appeared with a combination of the Palestinian flag and Al-Aqsa Mosque printed on the ends of the fabric.

In 2006, the prime minister of Spain, José Luis Rodríguez Zapatero gave a speech in which he criticized Israel harshly, then accepted a keffiyeh from members of the audience and had his photo taken wearing it.

The keffiyeh print has been many times used in fashion by brands such as Topshop, ASOS, Cecilie Copenhagen, Boohoo or the Israeli brand Dodo Bar Or, bringing controversy and debates about cultural appropriation. In 2007, the American clothing store chain Urban Outfitters stopped selling keffiyehs (sold under the name of "anti-war scarves") after facing criticism from "a pro-Israel activist ... [who] complained about the items". The company stated they had not intended "to imply any sympathy for or support of terrorists or terrorism" and that offence "was by no means [their] intention".

British-Palestinian hip-hop rapper Shadia Mansour denounced cultural appropriation of the keffiyeh, defending it as a symbol of Palestinian solidarity, in her first single, "" ("The keffiyeh is Arab"). She performs wearing a traditional Palestinian thawb and proclaims in her song: "This is how we wear the keffiyeh/The Arab keffiyeh" and "I'm like the keffiyeh/However you rock me/Wherever you leave me/I stay true to my origins/Palestinian." On-stage in New York, she introduced the song by saying, "You can take my falafel and hummus, but don't fucking touch my keffiyeh."

Production in Palestine

Today, this symbol of Palestinian identity is now largely imported from China. With the scarf's growing popularity in the 2000s, Chinese manufacturers entered the market, driving Palestinians out of the business. For five decades, Yasser Hirbawi had been the only Palestinian manufacturer of keffiyehs, making them across 16 looms at the Hirbawi Textile Factory in Hebron. In 1990, all 16 of the looms were functioning, making around 750 keffiyehs per day. By 2010, only 2 looms were used, making a mere 300 keffiyehs per week. Unlike the Chinese manufactured ones, Hirbawi uses 100% cotton. Hirbawi's son Izzat stated the importance of creating the Palestinian symbol in Palestine: "the keffiyeh is a tradition of Palestine and it should be made in Palestine. We should be the ones making it."

See also
 Palestinian culture
List of national symbols of Palestine

References

Palestinian clothing
Palestinian inventions
National symbols of the State of Palestine